Gladson Awako (born December 31, 1990) is a Ghanaian footballer who plays as a midfielder and captains Accra Hearts of Oaks.

Career

Early career 
Awako began his career with Berekum Arsenal and joined in 2006 to All Stars F.C. who played his first profi matches in the Ghana Premier League. On 11 March 2008 was scouted from Heart of Lions and left also after two years All Stars F.C. He played than from May 2008 a half year on loan from Heart of Lions for Real Sportive between October 2008 on loan for Real Sportive before turned back to Heart of Lions.

On 29 April 2009 the 19-year-old Ghanaian U-20 National Team player by Heart of Lions completed a trial training at Tottenham Hotspur F.C. and was eyeing from Internazionale and A.C. Chievo in Italy.

Recreativo de Huelva 
On 17 February 2010 the Segunda División club Recreativo de Huelva signed him, but he couldn't play for the first team or the "B" squad until summer 2010. After a half year, he returned to his former club Heart of Lions. On 10 June 2011, he moved to the fellow league club Berekum Chelsea.

TP Mazembe 
On 17 October 2012 Awako joined Congolese giants TP Mazembe on a five-year contract.

At the end of November 2019, Awako move returned to Ghana and joined Accra Great Olympics.

International career 
Awako is member of the Ghana national under-20 football team at 2009 African Youth Championship in Rwanda and won with the team the tournament. He was called up for the Black Stars for a friendly game against Argentina national football team and made in the game on 1 October 2009 his debut.

Style of play 
Awako is highfFlying and skillful midfielder, who plays as Playmaker, he is also a former fullback.

Honours 
Berekum Chelsea

 President's Cup: 2012

TP Mazembe

 DR Congo Championship : 2013, 2013–14, 2015–16
 DR Congo Super Cup : 2013, 2014, 2016
 CAF Champions League : 2015
 Confederation Cup : 2016, runner up: 2013
 CAF Super Cup : 2016
Hearts of Oak

 President's Cup: 2022
 Ghanaian FA Cup: 2022

Ghana U20
 2009 African Youth Championship
 2009 FIFA U-20 World Cup

References

1990 births
Living people
Ghanaian footballers
Ghanaian expatriate footballers
Ghana international footballers
Ghana under-20 international footballers
Association football defenders
USL Championship players
Legon Cities FC players
Association football midfielders
Real Sportive players
People from Berekum
Heart of Lions F.C. players
Berekum Arsenal players
TP Mazembe players
Phoenix Rising FC players
Accra Great Olympics F.C. players
Expatriate footballers in Spain
Expatriate footballers in the Democratic Republic of the Congo
Expatriate soccer players in the United States
Ghanaian expatriate sportspeople in the Democratic Republic of the Congo
Ghanaian expatriate sportspeople in Spain
Ghanaian expatriate sportspeople in the United States
Ghana A' international footballers
2022 African Nations Championship players